Bendahara Paduka Raja Tun Perak (died 1498) was the fifth and most famous bendahara, a Malay rank similar to a prime minister, of the Sultanate of Malacca. He served under four sultans (Sultan Muzzafar Shah, Sultan Mansur Shah, Sultan Alauddin Riayat Shah and Sultan Mahmud Shah) from 1456 to 1498. Early in his life, Perak was a soldier-statesman for Malaccan rulers. In 1445, he led the Malaccan army to victory by defeating Siamese invaders. As a result, he was made bendahara in 1456.

Tun Perak was the son of Malacca's first bendahara, Sri Wak Raja Tun Perpatih Besar. In 1445, he was appointed as Malacca's representative in Klang. Tun Perak was then appointed as bendahara in 1456 after he upset the Siamese attack against Malacca. He stopped another Siamese invasion in 1456 as well. Tun Perak was also instrumental in colonising Pahang, Terengganu, Johor, Riau, Lingga, Bengkalis, Karimon, Rokan, Siak, Kampar, Jambi, Inderagiri and Aru. The rulers of these governments converted to Islam due to Malaccan influence. Tun Perak was very loyal towards the Malaccan Sultanate. When his son, Tun Besar was killed by Sultan Mahmud Shah's son Raja Muhammad due to a misunderstanding, he did not seek revenge against the sultan. Instead, he requested Raja Muhammad to be crowned elsewhere. The sultan honored Tun Perak's request, therefore Raja Muhammad was made a sultan in Pahang.

He died in 1498 and was replaced by his younger brother Tun Perpatih Putih. His death signified what is widely held to be the beginning of the Malaccan Empire's decline.

Awards and recognitions

Places named after him
Several places were named after him, including:
 Kolej Tun Perak, a residential college at Universiti Putra Malaysia, Serdang, Selangor
 Kolej Tun Perak, a residential college at Universiti Teknologi MARA, Alor Gajah, Malacca
 SMK Tun Perak, a secondary school in Jasin, Malacca
 SMK Tun Perak, a secondary school in Padang Rengas, Perak
 SMK Tun Perak, a secondary school at Jalan Salleh in Muar, Johor Darul Takzim
 SMK Agama Tun Perak, a secondary school in Jasin, Malacca
 SRA Taman Tun Perak, a primary school in Kajang, Selangor
 Taman Tun Perak, a residential area in Cheras, Selangor
 Jalan Tun Perak in Kuala Lumpur
 Jalan Tun Perak in Malacca
 Jalan Tun Perak in Ipoh, Perak

References

Bibliography 
Ahmad Fauzi bin Mohd Basri, Mohd Fo'ad bin Sakdan and Azami bin Man, 2004. Sejarah Tingkatan 1, Kuala Lumpur, DBP.
https://web.archive.org/web/20060413202402/http://sejarahmalaysia.pnm.my/

History of Malacca
People from Malacca
Malay people
1498 deaths
Year of birth unknown